Liam Scales (born 8 August 1998) is an Irish professional footballer who plays as a centre-back or left-back for Scottish Premiership club Aberdeen, on loan from Celtic.

Personal life
Scales is from Barndarrig, County Wicklow. He studied Irish and geography at University College Dublin. He is a fluent Irish speaker.

Club career

Early career
Scales began his career with Arklow Town before signing for UCD in 2015, making over 100 appearances for the club, and winning the Collingwood Cup as well as the League of Ireland First Division title in 2018. He was described as "a key player for UCD as they won the First Division title". Scales was voted by his fellow League of Ireland First Division players into the PFAI First Division Team of the Year for 2018.

In 2019 he underwent trials at English clubs Manchester City, and Bristol Rovers with him seeming to be set to sign for the latter before the deal fell through.

Shamrock Rovers
He moved to Shamrock Rovers for the 2020 season, and "played a significant part in their league success". He also made seven appearances for the club in European competitions, scoring once. In July 2021 he was described as "the hottest property in the League of Ireland" and linked with a transfer away from the club.

On 26 November 2021, he was named in the PFAI Team of the Year for 2021, as voted by his fellow players.

Celtic
After 51 appearances for Shamrock Rovers, Scales signed a four-year contract with Scottish club Celtic in August 2021. On 23 September 2021, he made his debut for Celtic in a 3–0 win over Raith Rovers in the Scottish League Cup at Celtic Park. Scales made his league debut on 5 December 2021, coming on as a substitute to score the third goal in Celtic's 3–0 away win at Dundee United. On 24 February 2022, Scales started in a 2–0 away defeat against Eliteserien side Bodø/Glimt in the UEFA Europa Conference League.

Aberdeen (loan) 
Scales went to Aberdeen for a season-long loan in June 2022. This transfer caused controversy amongst a section of the Aberdeen support, who launched criticism at their board for continuing to sign players on loan from Celtic. Aberdeen manager Jim Goodwin defended his signature, with him stating that: "I’m a big fan of the loan market as it gives you the opportunity to sign players that you would maybe not normally be able to afford. The size of club we are we want to be signing players on permanent contracts. That conversation was had with Celtic initially. We wanted to know what the number was and could we make it happen. Celtic are not willing to sell Liam at this moment".

On 10 July 2022, Scales made his Aberdeen debut in a 2–0 Scottish League Cup win at Peterhead. On 17 September 2022, Scales was sent off in 3–1 defeat at Hibernian after he was shown a second yellow card by referee David Dickinson. Four months later he was shown red again in a 6–0 loss against the same opposition, a result that saw manager Jim Goodwin removed from his position shortly after the match.

International career
Scales was a Republic of Ireland under-21 international, winning six caps.

He was called up to the Republic of Ireland senior team for the first time on 3 September 2021 alongside Alan Browne and Callum Robinson for the games against Azerbaijan and Serbia, with the trio replacing the injured Dara O'Shea, Nathan Collins and Shane Long. On 19 September 2022, Scales was called up again for UEFA Nations League group matches against Scotland and Armenia after Andrew Omobamidele was ruled out due a groin injury.

Career statistics

Honours
UCD
League of Ireland First Division: 2018
Collingwood Cup: 2018

Shamrock Rovers
League of Ireland Premier Division: 2020
League of Ireland Premier Division: 2021

Celtic
Scottish Premiership: 2021–22
Scottish League Cup: 2021–22

Individual
PFAI First Division Team of the Year: 2018
PFAI Premier Division Team of the Year: 2021

References

1998 births
Living people
Republic of Ireland association footballers
Arklow Town F.C. players
University College Dublin A.F.C. players
Shamrock Rovers F.C. players
Celtic F.C. players
League of Ireland players
Association football defenders
Republic of Ireland under-21 international footballers
Republic of Ireland expatriate association footballers
Irish expatriate sportspeople in Scotland
Expatriate footballers in Scotland
Scottish Professional Football League players
Aberdeen F.C. players